In Greek mythology, Poemander or Poimandros (Ancient Greek: Ποίμανδρον) was the son of Chaeresilaus (son of Iasius) and Stratonice. He was also the founder of Tanagra, which he named after the naiad Tanagra, his wife and the daughter of either Aeolus or Asopus. They had two sons, Leucippus and Ephippus, the father of Acestor.

Mythology 
Poemander was besieged by the Achaeans in a place called Stephon, for having refused to support them in the Trojan war. At night, he managed to escape and began to fortify Poemandria. His fortifications, however, were made fun of by the architect Polycritus, who leaped over the ditch in derision. Poemander, outraged, threw a stone at him, but missed and hit his own son Leucippus instead, who died of the injury. For the murder, in accordance with the law, Poemander had to leave Boeotia, which was not easy for him, since the land of Tanagra had been invaded by the Achaeans; moreover, his mother Stratonice was carried off by Achilles, who also killed his grandson Acestor. But Ephippus, sent by Poemander to beg for aid, brought Achilles, Tlepolemus and Peneleos to his father; they escorted Poemander to Elephenor, who cleansed him for the murder of Leucippus.

Notes

References 

 Lucius Mestrius Plutarchus, Moralia with an English Translation by Frank Cole Babbitt. Cambridge, MA. Harvard University Press. London. William Heinemann Ltd. 1936. Online version at the Perseus Digital Library. Greek text available from the same website.
 Pausanias, Description of Greece with an English Translation by W.H.S. Jones, Litt.D., and H.A. Ormerod, M.A., in 4 Volumes. Cambridge, MA, Harvard University Press; London, William Heinemann Ltd. 1918. . Online version at the Perseus Digital Library
 Pausanias, Graeciae Descriptio. 3 vols. Leipzig, Teubner. 1903.  Greek text available at the Perseus Digital Library.

Kings in Greek mythology
Boeotian characters in Greek mythology